Vasco Ramires Sr. (10 July 1939 – 21 January 2012) was a Portuguese equestrian. He competed in two events at the 1972 Summer Olympics.

References

1939 births
2012 deaths
Portuguese male equestrians
Olympic equestrians of Portugal
Equestrians at the 1972 Summer Olympics
Sportspeople from Coimbra